Ulric McKenzie (born 15 June 1918, date of death unknown) was a Guyanese cricketer. He played in six first-class matches for British Guiana from 1938 to 1945.

See also
 List of Guyanese representative cricketers

References

External links
 

1918 births
Year of death missing
Guyanese cricketers
Guyana cricketers
Sportspeople from Georgetown, Guyana